James Rariden (February 14, 1795 – October 20, 1856) was an American lawyer and politician who served two terms as  a U.S. Representative from Indiana, from 1837 to 1841.

Biography 
Born near Cynthiana, Kentucky, Rariden received a limited schooling.
He moved to Brookville, Indiana, and later to Salisbury, where he served as deputy clerk of court and studied law.

He was admitted to the bar in 1818 and began practice in Centerville, Indiana, in 1820.
He served as prosecuting attorney 1822–1825.

Political career 
He served in the State senate in 1823 and as a member of the State house of representatives in 1829, 1830, 1832, and 1833.

Rariden was elected as a Whig to the Twenty-fifth and Twenty-sixth Congresses (March 4, 1837 – March 3, 1841).

Later career and death 
In 1846, he moved to Cambridge City, Indiana.
He served as delegate to the State constitutional convention in 1850.

He died in Cambridge City, Indiana on October 20, 1856, and was interred in Riverside Cemetery.

References

1795 births
1856 deaths
Indiana state senators
Members of the Indiana House of Representatives
People from Harrison County, Kentucky
Whig Party members of the United States House of Representatives from Indiana
19th-century American politicians
People from Wayne County, Indiana
People from Brookville, Indiana